Ilinden is a district of Sofia, located in the western parts of the city.  it has 37,256 inhabitants. There are four neighbourhoods: "Zaharna Fabrika", "Gevgeliiski", "Sveta Troitsa" (Holy Trinity) and "Ilinden".

References

Districts of Sofia